Cristian Ioan Dancia (born 5 February 1980) is a Romanian former football player. He was a left defender.

Dancia joined the Turkish club Galatasaray at the beginning of the 2002–2003 season, to be tried. He played two friendly games, but Fatih Terim decided to not keep him, and he returned to Romania with his manager Gigi Becali.

External links

1980 births
Living people
Romanian footballers
Romania international footballers
FC Argeș Pitești players
FC Politehnica Timișoara players
FC Universitatea Cluj players
FC Torpedo Moscow players
CS Otopeni players
AFC Chindia Târgoviște players
CSC Dumbrăvița players
Liga I players
Liga II players
Russian Premier League players
Romanian expatriate footballers
Expatriate footballers in Russia
Association football defenders